The Al Waddan Hotel opened in 1936 as the Italian Uaddan Hotel & Casino.

History

It is a historic hotel in Tripoli, Libya, located overlooking the bay, just east of Grand Hotel Tripoli. Historically it was the grandest hotel in Tripoli and was referenced by an American journalist as being "the Waldorf Astoria of Tripoli" and wasnamed "a jewel of modern African architecture". It was built in 1935 at the same time as the Hotel Al Mehari.

It was designed by Italian architect Florestano Di Fausto, with the collaboration of Stefano Gatti-Casazza. It contained a casino and a 500-seat theatre.

It was completely restored at a cost of $16 million from 2007 to 2009 as an international luxury hotel and was managed for a number of years by InterContinental Hotels Group.

See also

 Grand Hotel Tripoli
 Hotel Al Mehari

References

External links
the "Grand Hotel" in Italian Tripoli

Hotels in Tripoli, Libya
Hotel buildings completed in 1935
Hotels established in 1935
1935 establishments in Libya
Casino hotels